"Day In, Day Out" is a song written by Marv Green and Thom McHugh, and recorded by American country music artist David Kersh.  It was released in May 1997 as the fourth single from his album Goodnight Sweetheart.  The song reached No. 11 on the Billboard Hot Country Singles & Tracks chart in September 1997.

Chart performance

Year-end charts

References

1997 singles
David Kersh songs
Curb Records singles
Songs written by Marv Green
Songs written by Thom McHugh
1996 songs